Napoleon Bonaparte (15 August 1769 – 5 May 1821) was a French military and political leader who rose to prominence during the latter stages of the French Revolution and the Napoleonic Wars.

Early years
1769
August 15: Napoleon Bonaparte was born in Ajaccio, Corsica

1785
October 28: Napoleon graduates from Ecole Militaire with the rank of second lieutenant in the artillery.
November 3: Stationed in Valence

1793
December 22: For his brilliant tactical command (although a subordinate officer, he was widely credited for the victory) at an internal French battle at Toulon, Napoleon receives the new rank of brigadier general

1794
August 9–20: Napoleon is imprisoned under suspicion of being a Jacobin and a supporter of Robespierre.

1795
October: Royalist 13 Vendémiaire rising put down by Napoleon. Barras helps Napoleon win promotion to Commander of the Interior
October 15: At the home of Paul Barras, a Directory member, Napoleon meets Rose de Beauharnais (Joséphine)
2 November: Directory (le Directoire) established

1796
March 2: Napoleon is given command of the French army in Italy
March 11: Italian campaign against Austria begins
May 10: Napoleon wins the Battle of Lodi
November 17: Napoleon wins the Battle of Arcole

1797
January 14: Napoleon wins the Battle of Rivoli
October 17: Treaty of Campo Formio with Austria
December 5: Napoleon returns to Paris as a hero

1798
May 19: Napoleon begins his Egyptian campaign with an army of 38,000
July 21: Wins Battle of the Pyramids against Mamelukes in Egypt
July 24: Fall of Cairo
August 3: Under the command of Admiral Nelson, the British fleet destroys the French navy in the Battle of the Nile. Napoleon's army is cut off from supplies and communication

Napoleonic era
1799
August 23: Receiving news of turmoil in France, Napoleon relinquishes command in Egypt to Kléber and returns to Paris, a so-called Coup d’état
November 9–10: Coup of 18 Brumaire Napoleon overthrows the Directory
December 12: Napoleon elected First Consul of the Consulate

1800
June 14: Battle of Marengo
December 24: Napoleon escapes an assassination attempt

1801
February 9: Treaty with Austria signed at Lunéville, Treaty of Lunéville
July 8: Battle of Algeciras
July 15: Concordat of 1801

1802
March 25: Treaty of Amiens
May 1: Napoleon restructures French educational system
May 19: Légion d'honneur established
August 2: New constitution adopted, plebiscite confirms Napoleon as First Consul for life

1803
May 3: Napoleon sells the Louisiana Territory to the U.S.
May 18: Britain declares war on France
May 26: France invades Hanover

1804
March 21: Introduction of the Civil Code (also known as Napoleon Code)
May 18: Napoleon proclaimed Emperor of the French by the Senate
December 2: Napoleon crowns himself emperor, in the company of the Pope

1805
October 19: Battle of Ulm
October 21: Battle of Trafalgar; Admiral Lord Nelson killed
October 30: Battle of Caldiero
December 2: Battle of Austerlitz

1806
March 30: Napoleon names his brother, Joseph Bonaparte, King of Naples, and appoints other family members to various other posts
July 12: Confederation of the Rhine established with Napoleon as Protector. Initially had 16 member states, later others added, including kingdoms of Saxony and Westphalia
August 6: Holy Roman Empire abolished
September 15: Prussia joins Britain and Russia against Napoleon
October 14: Battle of Jena and Battle of Auerstadt
November 21: The Berlin Decree (1806), which initiated the Continental System was issued

1807
February 8: Battle of Eylau
June 14: Battle of Friedland
June 25: Treaty of Tilsit signed between Russia and France
October 27: Treaty of Fontainebleau (1807) secretly agreed between Napoleon and Spain to partition Portugal

1808
March 17: Imperial University established
May 2: Spanish people rise up against France. Often referred to as Dos de Mayo Uprising
May 3: Napoleon's soldiers retaliate for uprising by brutally executing Spanish citizens (famously depicted in Goya's The Third of May 1808)
July 7: Joseph crowned King of Spain after Portugal revolts against the Continental System/blockade Napoleon had put in place. Napoleon collected five armies to advance into Portugal and 'bullied' the Spanish royal family into resigning
Peninsular War
July 16–19: Battle of Bailén

1809
April 19: Battle of Raszyn
May 22: Battle of Aspern-Essling; first defeat of Napoleon in 10 years
July 5–6: Battle of Wagram; success for Napoleon, Austria loses territory and must enforce the Continental System
October 14: Treaty of Schönbrunn signed
December 14: Public announcement of Napoleon's divorce from Joséphine

1810
March 11: Napoleon marries Marie Louise of Austria by proxy in Vienna
April 1: Napoleon officially marries Marie Louise, Duchess of Parma in Paris

1811
March 20: Napoleon II, Napoleon's son born, styled as the King of Rome

1812
July 22: Battle of Salamanca
August 4–6: Battle of Smolensk
September 1: Moscow evacuated
September 7: Battle of Borodino
September 14: Napoleon arrives in Moscow to find the city abandoned and set alight by the inhabitants; retreating in the midst of a frigid winter, the army suffers great losses
October 19: Beginning of the Great Retreat from Moscow
October 24: Battle of Maloyaroslavets
November: Crossing of the River Berezina
December: Grande Armée expelled from Russia

1813
April 2: Battle of Lüneburg
May 2: Battle of Lützen
May 20–21: Battle of Bautzen
May 26: Battle of Haynau
June 4–26: Armistice of Poischwitz
June 21: Battle of Vitoria
August 15: Siege of Danzig
August 23: Battle of Großbeeren
August 26–27: Battle of Dresden
August 26: Battle of Katzbach
August 27: Battle of Hagelberg
August 29–30: Battle of Kulm
August 31: Battle of San Marcial
September 6: Battle of Dennewitz
September 16: Battle of the Göhrde
September 28: Battle of Altenburg
October 3: Battle of Wartenburg
October 7: Battle of Bidassoa
October 14: Battle of Liebertwolkwitz
October 16–19: Battle of Leipzig
October 30–31: Battle of Hanau
November 10: Battle of Nivelle
October 31: End of the Siege of Pamplona
December 7: Battle of Bornhöved
December 9–13: Battles of the Nive
December 10: Battle of Sehestedt

1814
February 10–14: Six Days Campaign
February 15: Battle of Garris
February 27: Battle of Orthez
April 10: Battle of Toulouse
March 30–31: Battle of Paris
April 4: Napoleon abdicates his rule and Louis XVIII, a Bourbon, is restored to the French throne
April 11: Treaty of Fontainebleau (1814) Napoleon agrees to exile in Elba, the allies agree to pay his family a pension
April 14: Battle of Bayonne
May 4: Napoleon is exiled to Elba; his wife and son take refuge in Vienna

1815

February 26: Napoleon escapes from Elba
March 20: Napoleon arrives in Paris
Beginning of the Hundred Days
June 16: Battle of Ligny
June 18: Napoleon is defeated in the Battle of Waterloo
June 28: Second restoration of Louis XVIII
October 16: Napoleon is exiled to Saint Helena
November 20: Treaty of Paris (1815)

1821
May 5: Napoleon dies

References
Jack Allen Meyer (1987). An Annotated Bibliography of the Napoleonic Era: Recent Publications, 1945-1985

Further reading
William Leonard Langer & Peter N. Stearns. The Encyclopedia of World History: Ancient, Medieval, and Modern, Chronologically, Edition: 6, Houghton Mifflin Harcourt, 2001 ,  Chapter "The Napoleonic Period, 1799-1815", pp. 435–441

External links
 Napoleon's itinerary day by day

Napoleonic era